Nicola Shulman Phipps Marchioness of Normanby  (born 1960), is a British biographer, former model, and aristocrat. After her marriage in 1990 she has been known as Nicola Phipps, Marchioness of Normanby.

Early life
Nicola Shulman was born into a Jewish family, the daughter of Milton Shulman, the former theatre reviewer for the London Evening Standard, and Drusilla Beyfus, an author of etiquette books. Her brother, Jason Shulman, is an artist, while her sister, Alexandra Shulman, is the former editor in chief of British Vogue.

Shulman graduated from Corpus Christi College, Oxford.

Career
Lady Normanby started her career as a model. She later worked for Harpers & Queen. She is the author of two biographies. Her second book, Graven with Diamonds, was reviewed in The Daily Telegraph, The Guardian, The Times, The Sunday Times,  and The Independent.

Personal life
Shulman has been married twice. Her first husband was novelist Edward St Aubyn. After they divorced, she married Constantine Phipps, 5th Marquess of Normanby, whom she met at the Groucho Club. They have three children:

Lady Sibylla Victoria Evelyn Phipps (born 6 August 1992)
John Samuel Constanine Phipps, Earl of Mulgrave (born 26 November 1994)
Lord Thomas Henry Winston Phipps (born 3 June 1997)

Works

References

1960 births
Living people
People from Belgravia
English Jews
Alumni of Corpus Christi College, Oxford
English biographers
English women non-fiction writers
Normanby
English people of Ukrainian-Jewish descent
Women biographers
Writers from London